Black Baldy is a type of crossbred beef cattle produced by crossing Hereford cattle with a solid black breed, usually Aberdeen Angus. The term is particularly used in Australia and New Zealand. In North America, the term "Black Whiteface" is also used in some regions. They are becoming common in the upper Midwest US.

It is characterized by a white face similar to the Hereford, but the red body color of the Hereford is replaced by black from the Angus. This is because both the alleles for white faces and black coat color are both genetically dominant in cattle.

Black Baldy cows are noted for their good mothering abilities. In addition to general hybrid vigor expected with a crossbred, the cross also produces black skin, which in sunny climates reduces the prevalence of sunburn on bare skin, such as the udder of the cow. Angus bulls are also mated with Hereford heifers in an attempt to produce smaller calves and reduce dystocia during birth.

The prevalence of Black Baldies significantly increases wherever cattle breeders switch from the traditional Hereford herds to the Aberdeen Angus breed.

A cross of Hereford cattle on predominantly black-colored dairy breeds results in a similarly marked crossbred called the Black Hereford in Britain and Ireland.

Cattle crossbreeds
Hereford cattle